At the Stroke of the Angelus is a silent short film starring Charles Clary and Francelia Billington. Billington portrays an American girl kidnapped in early childhood and brought up as a Mexican thief and street dancer. She falls in love with a wealthy American, who they come to believe may be her uncle.

Synopsis 

On a 1850s migration trail, John Ford (Clary) must leave a stranded wagon train in search of help. Left behind are his ailing sister, Amy, and her young daughter, and they die shortly after John's departure. Only an unrelated young girl survives. Outlaw Pedro (Warren) ransacks the wagons, kidnapping the surviving girl and placing Amy's heirloom necklace around the girl's throat.

Pedro raises the girl as his foster daughter, Anita (Billington). At age eighteen, she works for Pedro in Mexico as a thief and street dancer. She meets and falls in love with John, with neither knowing of their shared history. Pedro becomes jealous, and Anita intervenes to save John's life. Afterward, in her hut, Anita lifts her crucifix as the Angelus bell strikes. John recognizes his sister's chain, and departs, believing Anita must be his niece. Later, Pedro is caught robbing a mission altar. His conscience compels him to confess that Anita is not John's niece, and the lovers are reunited.

Cast
 Charles Clary as John Ford
 Francelia Billington as Anita
 Edward Warren as Pedro
 Anna Mae Walthall as Señorita Ynez (as Anna May Walthall)
 Wilbur Higby as Anita's father

Source:

References

External links 
 

1915 drama films
Silent American drama films
1910s English-language films